Aydoğan is a Turkish name and may refer to:

Given name
 Aydoğan Babaoğlu, retired Turkish military officer
 Aydoğan Vatandaş, investigative journalist from Turkey

Surname
 Eray Aydoğan, Turkish basketballer
 Mustafa Aydogan, contemporary Kurdish writer and translator
 Müslüm Aydoğan, Turkish footballer
 Nilay Aydogan (1992–2023), Turkish basketball player

Places
 Aydoğan, Bala, a village in the district of Balâ, Ankara Province
 Aydoğan, Refahiye
 Aydoğan, Sungurlu

Turkish-language surnames
Turkish masculine given names